Juryab (also Romanized as Jūryāb and Jowryāb; also known as Dzhoryab, Joor Yab, Joriāb,  and Jowryāf) is a village in Gafsheh-ye Lasht-e Nesha Rural District, Lasht-e Nesha District, Rasht County, Gilan Province, Iran. At the 2006 census, its population was 754, in 273 families.

References 

Populated places in Rasht County